Oley Valley School District is a school district located in Berks County, Pennsylvania. It serves the townships of Alsace, Oley, Pike, and Ruscombmanor.

Schools
Oley Valley Elementary School
Oley Valley Middle School
Oley Valley High School

External links
Oley Valley School District

References

School districts in Berks County, Pennsylvania